A by-election was held for the Australian House of Representatives seat of Gwydir on 7 June 1969. This was triggered by the resignation of Country Party MP Ian Allan, who had been appointed Secretary-General and regional director of ANZAC war graves in the Pacific Region of the Commonwealth War Graves Commission. As a by-election for the seat of Bendigo had just been called, the two were held on the same day.

The by-election was won by Country Party candidate Ralph Hunt.

Candidates
The Country Party candidate, Ralph Hunt, was the NSW and federal chairman of the party, and a farmer and grazier from northern New South Wales.

The Labor candidate, Roger Nott, was a member of the New South Wales Legislative Assembly for Liverpool Plains, largely located within Gwydir, from 1941 until 1961, and served as a minister in the Cahill and Heffron governments, before being appointed by the Menzies government as Administrator of the Northern Territory.

Key dates

Results

References

1969 elections in Australia
New South Wales federal by-elections
June 1969 events in Australia